

Events
January - It is announced that the Deutsches Filmorchester Babelsberg will join KM Music Conservatory musicians in a 100-member concert tour of five Indian cities performing compositions by Indian composer A. R. Rahman. The tour, named "Germany and India 2011–2012: Infinite Opportunities'. Classic Incantations", marks the centenary of Indian cinema and of Studio Babelsberg, the world's oldest film studio.
February 4 - An anti-government rally at Bolotnaya Square, Moscow, is concluded by Yuri Shevchuk with one of his best-known songs, "Rodina" (Motherland).
February 17 - Start of Season 7 of the music competition Indonesian Idol.
March 2 - Release of London, Paris, New York, starring Ali Zafar and Aditi Rao Hydari.
May - Biennial International Morin khuur Festival and competition.
July 7 - 59th Filmfare Awards South ceremony is held at the Jawaharlal Nehru Stadium, Chennai, India.
August 24 - Pianist Lang Lang is awarded the Cross of Merit of the Federal Republic of Germany for his engagement in the Schleswig-Holstein Musik Festival.
September - Chinese pianist Jiayan Sun finishes third in the Leeds International Pianoforte Competition.
September 27-30 - Darbar festival takes place in London.
December 1 - Opening of the 2012 Madras Music Season.

Albums
Shadmehr Aghili - Tarafdaar
Angband - Saved from the Truth
Arnob - Adheko Ghume
Buck-Tick - Yume Miru Uchuu
Tay Kewei - Fallin
Shiri Maimon - Sheleg Ba'sharav
Assala Nasri - Qanoun Kaifik
Krizza Neri - Krizza
Ramin Rahimi - Persian Percussion Electrified
Replikas - Biz Burada Yok İken
Fazıl Say - Istanbul Symphony
SKE48 - Kono Hi no Chime o Wasurenai
Wanting Qu - Everything In The World
Haifa Wehbe - Malikat Jamal Al Kawn

Classical
Fazıl Say - Symphony No 3 Universe

Opera
Yin Qing - The Ballad of Canal

Musical films
Fairy Tail the Movie: Phoenix Priestess (Japan)
Hoore! Hoore! (Malaysia)
I Do Bidoo Bidoo: Heto nAPO Sila! (Philippines)
I Love You (Bangladesh)
McDull: The Pork of Music (Hong Kong)
Mihashin Furaana Dhandhen (Maldives)
Satrangi Re (India)

Deaths
January 1 - Yafa Yarkoni, Israeli singer, 86
February 5 - Jiang Ying, Chinese opera singer and music teacher, 92
March 24 - Jose Prakash, Indian singer and actor, 86
March 28 - Alexander Arutiunian, Armenian composer, 91
May 2 - Zvi Zeitlin, Russian violinist and music teacher, 90
May 29 - Mark Minkov, Russian composer, 67
June 4 - Eduard Khil, Russian baritone, 77
June 14 - Hassan Kassai, Iranian Ney player, 83
July 10 - Viktor Suslin, Russian composer, 70
July 17 - İlhan Mimaroğlu, Turkish-born American composer and record producer, 86
October 5 - Edvard Mirzoyan, Armenian composer, 91
October 8 - Bidit Lal Das, Bengali folk musician and composer, 74
November 15 - Khin Maung Toe, Burmese singer-songwriter and guitarist, 62 (liver cancer)
December 11 
Ravi Shankar, Indian sitar player and composer, 92 
Galina Vishnevskaya, Russian soprano opera singer and recitalist, 86
December 20 - Victor Merzhanov, Russian classical pianist, 93

See also 
 2012 in music
 2012 in Japanese music
 List of 2012 albums

References 

Asia
Asian music
2012 in Asia